Profound Decisions is a company running live action role-playing games in the United Kingdom. The company was founded in 2004 to run Maelstrom, a fantasy game with colonial themes which attracted around 900 players.

Since 2012, Profound's principal game has been Empire, which has a growing player base, currently around 1,850 players per event across its 4 annual games. Between 2010 and 2016, Profound Decisions also ran Odyssey, a game set in the classical period.

References

External links 
 Profound Decisions

Companies established in 2004
Live-action role-playing games
2004 establishments in the United Kingdom